"Albuquerque" is the last song of "Weird Al" Yankovic's Running with Scissors album (1999). At 11 minutes and 23 seconds, it is the longest song Yankovic has ever recorded.

With the exception of the choruses and occasional bridges, the track is mostly a spoken word narration about a made-up person's life in Albuquerque, New Mexico, after winning a first-class one-way airplane ticket to the city. According to Yankovic, the song is in the style of the "hard-driving rock narrative" of artists like The Rugburns, Mojo Nixon and George Thorogood.

Song and lyrics

Yankovic set off to write the lengthy song, considering it as a final track for Running with Scissors. The long, meandering story was not expected to be popular and instead Yankovic wanted to compose a song "that's just going to annoy people for 12 minutes", making it feel like an "odyssey" for the listener after making it through to the end. Yankovic described writing the song as "free flowing," writing down a great deal of material he thought would be funny including previous anecdotes he had recorded, and trimming it down to form a lengthy "semi-cohesive story." The lyrics were too long to include in the liner notes for the album (it ends mid-sentence and goes into a written apology by Yankovic), saying that the listener will have to figure them out for themselves. The full lyrics were posted to Yankovic's website.

The song starts with Al talking about his childhood with a paranoid mother who force-feeds him sauerkraut until he is "26 and a half" years old. One day while listening to the radio, he hears about a contest in which contestants "correctly guess the number of molecules in Leonard Nimoy's butt". He wins the contest, only being off by 3. The grand prize is a first class one-way ticket to Albuquerque.

During the flight, 3 of the engines burn out, causing the plane to crash and explode, killing everyone on board, except him since he "had his tray table up and his seat back in the full upright position". He finds himself crawling, while carrying some random things of his belongings, until he reaches his destination.

He checks into a Holiday Inn, noting that it is so clean one can eat soup out of the ashtrays, taking his time to relax until someone knocks. Although he asks multiple times who it is, he receives no answer. When he finally opens the door himself, he's greeted by "a big, fat hermaphrodite with a Flock of Seagulls haircut and only one nostril", who rushes in and grabs his lucky snorkel. The two engage in a fight, only for the "one-nostriled" man to escape with his snorkel. He vows to stop at nothing until the mysterious man "was brought to justice", but first decides to buy some donuts.

Upon driving to the local donut shop, he asks for many types of donuts and pastries, one at a time, only to be told each one is sold out. Finally the shopkeeper admits that all they have is a box of crazed weasels. Al purchases the box, but the weasels inside bite his face and latch on. As he runs around town screaming for help, he runs into a woman named Zelda, who points out the weasels on his face. The two fall in love, marry, buy a house, and have children named Nathaniel and Superfly. One night, after Zelda asks him about joining the Columbia Record Club, he freaks out due to his fear of commitment and they break up, never to see each other again.

Shortly afterwards he "achieved his lifelong dream": getting a part-time job at the Sizzler, where he makes employee of the month for extinguishing the grease fire using his own face. He then tells an anecdote about the time he spotted his Sizzler co-worker Marty trying to carry "a big ol' sofa" up a flight of stairs. He asks Marty if he needs help, to which Marty replies sarcastically, "Nooo, I want you to cut off my arms and legs with a chainsaw!" Taking Marty literally, Al complies. Marty then points out that his remark was not serious, but Al questions how he was supposed to know. Later, Marty earns the nickname "Torso Boy".

This reminds him of yet another incident in which a man tells him he "hasn't had a bite in 3 days". He responds by biting the man's jugular vein, thinking it would be funny, causing the man to start screaming and bleeding everywhere. Al believes some people "just can't take a joke" when they don't laugh.

At this point, Al loses his train of thought, and reveals that the point he was attempting to make was his hatred for sauerkraut. He ends the song by giving advice to the listener, claiming that no matter how hard life is, there's "still a little place called Albuquerque".

Recording and performance
At the end of the song (around 11:20, after the music ends), faint laughter can be heard in the background. As Yankovic says, "That's Jim West laughing - I thought it would be a good way to end the album. He's cracking up because of the stupid chord he played at the end of the song."

Reception
Contrary to Yankovic's belief that the song would not be popular, it was one of the best-received songs from the album, and Yankovic incorporated the song as an encore to his tours. When performing this song live, Yankovic has been known to extend the song, by listing off more types of donuts, including blueberry, strawberry, raspberry, boysenberry, loganberry, gooseberry, dingleberry, Halle Berry, Chuck Berry, old-fashioned donuts and Nanaimo bars (when performing in British Columbia), as well as Saskatoon berry donuts (when performing in Saskatchewan); listing more names "Zelda" calls Yankovic; not telling the "amusing anecdote" at first; and even starting the song over completely after he "loses his train of thought." When performing this song live in Canada, Al is known to replace the dream job at Sizzler with one at Tim Hortons, a Canadian doughnut shop. During the guitar solo of the third chorus, Yankovic sometimes introduces West eagerly, but West plays "Mary Had a Little Lamb" instead of the real solo. Yankovic acts disappointed, and West walks away acting ashamed. As of his 2022 tour, Yankovic stops the song after using the word "hermaphrodite" to acknowledge that the word was now considered a slur, and that the song was a product of an earlier, more ignorant time.

In 2006, Flash cartoonist Ryan Krzak, also known by the online handle RWappin, uploaded a fan-made animated music video on Newgrounds titled Albuquerque: THE MOVIE.  it has gotten over 400 thousand views, and millions more views via reuploads to other sites such as YouTube. RWappin also made a music video for Yankovic's song "Everything You Know Is Wrong" with the same character.

Doom 3 contains a thin reference to the song - an email in one of the in-game PDAs mentions a character whose arms and legs were dismembered by the "Albuquerck Capacitor", therefore giving him the nickname "Torso Boy".

See also
List of songs by "Weird Al" Yankovic
Shaggy dog story
The King of Rock 'n' Roll, another song sometimes sought by this name.

References

"Weird Al" Yankovic songs
1999 songs
Songs written by "Weird Al" Yankovic
American hard rock songs
Albuquerque, New Mexico
Songs about cities in the United States
Songs about New Mexico
Compositions with a narrator